Jamaica's fourteen parishes are subdivided into sixty-three constituencies, which in turn are subdivided into electoral divisions.

Electoral divisions as of 2019

The following is the list of electoral divisions (as at April 2019) in each constituency.

References
 Parishes - Electoral Commission of Jamaica

 
Administrative divisions in North America